Adrienne Murphy (born 1990) is an Irish model and beauty pageant titleholder who was crowned Miss Universe Ireland 2012 and represented Ireland at the Miss Universe 2012 pageants.

Murphy first won the title of Miss Dandelion.  Coming from the working class town of Clondalkin, she was awarded the Miss Universe Ireland crown on 2 November 2012. She then traveled to the 2012 Miss Universe pageant in Las Vegas held in December 2012.

Life and career
Murphy is an advertising and marketing student in Ireland, and has also done modeling.

References

External links
Official Miss Universe Ireland website
Official Miss Universe Ireland facebook

1990 births
Living people
Miss Universe Ireland winners
Miss Universe 2012 contestants
People from Clondalkin
Beauty pageant contestants from Ireland